Plane-form enamel hypoplasia is often seen as the most severe type of enamel hypoplasia, and results from enamel matrix formation stopping, resulting in areas of crown with little or no dental enamel deposition. A relatively short period of severe stress can potentially lead to a very large defect. Plane-form enamel hypoplasia can be caused by a variety of factors, including severe illness/malnutrition, as well as specific conditions such as amelogenesis imperfecta and congenital syphilis. In severe cases enamel can be completely missing from areas of the crown, exposing the underlying dentine.

References 

Dental enamel
Developmental tooth disorders